Octavian Țîcu (born 21 August 1972) is a Moldovan politician, historian, and former professional boxer serving as a Member of Parliament in Moldova since 2019. He was Ministry of Youth and Sport in 2013.

Biography
Octavian Țîcu is a research coordinator at the Institute of History, Academy of Science of the Republic of Moldova and Associate Professor at Moldova State University and Free International University of Moldova (ULIM). Octavian Țîcu holds a degree in history from the Alexandru Ioan Cuza University of Iași, Romania, where he also studied for a Ph.D. (1994–2000). He is author of ten books (published in Germany, USA, UK, and Romania).

Țîcu was a member of the Commission for the Study of the Communist Dictatorship in Moldova. He has received numerous awards that allowed him to do research in Romania, Russia, Hungary, France, Switzerland, Lithuania, and the United States of America. Presently he is a researcher-coordinator at the Institute of History, Academy of Science of Moldova.

On February 26, 2013 Octavian Țîcu assumed office of Ministry of Youth and Sport of Republic of Moldova. He was elected member of Parliament of Moldova in the 2019 parliamentary election running as independent within the ACUM Electoral Bloc.

On September 17, 2019, he left Bloc ACUM invoking the continuation of alliance with pro-Russian Socialist Party, considered "a political mistake", and run as independent candidate for Mayor of Chișinău, coming in 4th place with 5% of votes. On December 7, 2019 he was elected President of the National Unity Party (PUN), which is an unionist, pro-Romanian oriented political party. In November 2020 he participated as candidate of PUN to the Presidential elections and achieved the 6th place with some 2% of votes (27 thousands voters). Next year, as result of lost Parliamentary elections on July 11, 2021, O.Țîcu has retired from PUN leadership and from political activity, and returned to academic issues.

Professional boxing career
 1995–2003: Seven times National Champion of Moldova;
 1995: World Championship, Berlin (Germany). Lost first round to Serafim Todorov (Bulgaria);
 1996: V place to European Championship, Vejle (Denmark). Qualified to Olympic Summer Games;
 1996: Vice-Champion of Bulgaria for club "Slavia" Sofia;
 1996: Participant to the Summer Olympic Games, Atlanta (USA).Lost first round to Toncho Tonchev (Bulgaria);
 1996: Golden medalist at Golden Glove, Beograd (Yugoslavia);
 1997: Bronze medalist at Czech Grand Prix, Usti nad Labem (Czech Republic);
 1997: World Championship, Budapest (Hungary). Lost first round to Dimitar Shtilianov (Bulgaria);
 1998: Silver medalist at Chemiepocale, Halle (Germany). Qualified to European Championship;
 1998: European Championship, Minsk (Belarus). Lost first round to A. Serdiuk (Ukraine);
 1998: Golden medalist at Beogradski Pobednik, Beograd (Yugoslavia);
 1999: Silver medalist at European Cup, Lvov (Ukraine);
 1999: Bronze medalist at Black Sea Cup, Sevastopol (Ukraine) (Qualification Tournament to the Olympic Summer Games);
 2000: Bronze medalist at Golden Belt, Bucharest (Romania);
 2001: IX place at World Championship, Belfast (Northern Ireland);
 2001: Silver medalist at Feliks Stamm, Warsaw (Poland);
 2002: Bronze medalist at Golden Belt, Bucharest (Romania);
 2002: European Championship, Permi (Russia). Lost first round to Filip Palici (Croatia);
 2003: Golden medalist at Beogradski Pobednik, Beograd (Serbia);
 2003: Bronze medalist at Feliks Stamm, Warsaw (Poland) - the last international tournament.

Publications
 Țîcu, O. (2019), O istorie ilustrată a românilor de la est de Prut (1791–prezent), Chișinău. Litera. 2019;
 Țîcu, O. (2018), Homo Moldovanus Sovietic: Teorii și practici de constucție identitară în R(A)SSM (1924–1989), Chișinău.Arc, 2018;
 Dulatbekov, N., Țîcu, O., Miloiu, S. (2016), Spassk 99: O istorie a prizonierilor de război români în documente, Bucharest. Eikon, 2016, 598 pp.;	
 Țîcu, O. and Bogus, B. (2014): Nicolae Simatoc (1920–1979). Legenda unui fotbalist basarabean de la Ripensia la FC Barcelona, Ediția II, Chișinău. Cartdidact, 267 pp.;
 S. Miloiu, O. Țîcu, V. Jarmolenko (2013), From Neighbourhood to Partnership: Highlights of Lithuania Relations with Romania and Moldova, Târgoviște: Cetatea de Scaun, 2013, 311 pp.;
 Țîcu, O. and Bogus, B. (2013): Nicolae Simatoc (1920–1979). Legenda unui fotbalist basarabean de la Ripensia la FC Barcelona, Chișinau. Cartdidact, 211 pp.;
 Țîcu, O. and Bogus, B. (2010): East European Football from Communism to Globalization, Saarbruken. Lambert Academic Publishing, 167 pp.;
 Țîcu, O. and Bogus, B. (2008): Fotbalul în contextul transformărilor democratice din Europa de Est. Cazul Ucrainei, României şi Republicii Moldova. (Football in the context of democratic transformations in Eastern Europe. The case of Ukraine, Romania and Moldova), Chişinău. Cartdidact. 144 pp.;
 Țîcu, O. (2004): Problema Basarabiei şi relaţiile sovieto-române în perioada interbelică (1919–1939) (The Bessarabia Problem and Soviet-Romanian Relationships in the Interwar Period (1919–1939)). Chişinău. Prut International. 269 pp.

Awards
 In 2016, he was awarded the Medal "Olympic Merit" by the President of the National Olympic Committee of Moldova.
 In 2010, he was awarded the Medal "Civic Merit" by the President of the Republic of Moldova.
 In 2004, he received the National Youth Prize in the field of Science and Literature for his monograph, entitled The Problem of Basarabia and Soviet-Romanian Ties in the Interwar Period (1919–1939).

External links

Octavian Ticu, al doilea la Cupa Europei
 Preşedintele interimar al Republicii Moldova Mihai Ghimpu a emis un decret prezidenţial privind constituirea Comisiei pentru studierea şi aprecierea regimului comunist totalitar din Republica Moldova.
Moldovan authorities going to condemn communist regime…
Hundreds of thousands of cases to be examined by commission for combating Communism 
http://www.privesc.eu/?p=1884 - The first press conference of the Commission, Moldpress, January 18, 2010. Video.
https://web.archive.org/web/20100309165120/http://www.timpul.md/article/2010/01/18/5881 - interview with Gheorghe Cojocaru, president of the Commission.
 
Site-ul Parlamentului Republicii Moldova
http://www.timpul.md/articol/omul-saptamanii-octavian-tacu-23486.html
https://web.archive.org/web/20150402144210/http://www.fanbase.com/Octavian-Ticu

References

1972 births
People from Ungheni District
Romanian people of Moldovan descent
Living people
Alexandru Ioan Cuza University alumni
20th-century Moldovan historians
Members of the Commission for the Study of the Communist Dictatorship in Moldova
Olympic boxers of Moldova
Boxers at the 1996 Summer Olympics
Lightweight boxers
21st-century Moldovan politicians
Moldovan MPs 2019–2023
21st-century Moldovan historians